Taff-Ely was a local government district with borough status in Wales from 1974 to 1996.

History
The borough was formed in 1974 as a local government district of Mid Glamorgan. It covered parts of five former districts which were abolished at the same time, and was initially arranged into ten communities based on the former districts and parishes:
Llanharan‡
Llanharry‡
Llanilid‡
Llanilterne, formerly a parish in Cardiff Rural District
Llantrisant, formerly a parish in Llantrisant and Llantwit Fardre Rural District
Llantwit Fardre, formerly a parish in Llantrisant and Llantwit Fardre Rural District
Pentyrch, formerly a parish in Cardiff Rural District
Peterson-super-Montem‡
Pontypridd, covering Pontypridd Urban District
Taff's Well, covering the Taff's Well ward from Caerphilly Urban District
‡Formerly a parish in Cowbridge Rural District

The borough was named after the River Taff and the River Ely.

The communities within the borough were reorganised in 1985, which saw the small community of Llanilterne (where the main settlement was Capel Llanilltern) absorbed into Pentyrch, the communities of Llanilid and Peterson-super-Montem absorbed into Llanharan, and the large community of Llantrisant divided into the four communities of Gilfach Goch, Tonyrefail, Pont-y-clun, and a smaller Llantrisant community.

In 1996 the borough was abolished, with most of the area going to the new principal area of Rhondda Cynon Taf, with the exception of Pentyrch community going to Cardiff.

Political control
The first election to the council was held in 1973, initially operating as a shadow authority before coming into its powers on 1 April 1974. Political control of the council from 1974 until its abolition in 1996 was held by the following parties:

Premises

The council was based at the Municipal Buildings on Gelliwastad Road in Pontypridd, which had been built in 1904 as the headquarters of Pontypridd Urban District Council. Since the council's abolition in 1996 the building has been used as a register office for Rhondda Cynon Taf County Borough Council.

References

Districts of Wales abolished in 1996
1974 establishments in Wales
Mid Glamorgan